West Dagomba District is a former district council that was located in Northern Region, Ghana. Originally created as an ordinary district assembly in 1975. However on 1988, it was split off into three new district assemblies: Tamale Municipal District (capital: Tamale), Savelugu-Nanton District (capital: Savelugu) and Tolon-Kumbungu District (capital: Tolon). The district assembly was located in the western part of Northern Region and had Tamale as its capital town.

References

1988 disestablishments in Africa

Districts of the Northern Region (Ghana)

Former districts of Ghana

States and territories disestablished in 1988